Kangsi Coming was a Taiwanese variety-comedy talk show hosted by variety show veterans Dee Hsu (徐熙娣 a.k.a. Xiao S) and Kevin Tsai (蔡康永). It was produced by Chungta Production (中大製作) from 2004 to 2009, and currently produced by Gin Star Entertainment (金星娛樂) along with the writing and production staff of GUESS. It was first broadcast on 5 January 2004 and ended in 2016. In most episodes, the hosts interview a panel of celebrities in various and controversial topics while employing their signature comedic bantering. It is broadcast in Hong Kong on ATV Home under the name of Variety Show of Mr Con and Ms Csi.<ref>[http://www.hkatv.com/v3/infoprogram/09/varietyshowofmrconandmscsi/index.html Variety Show of Mr. Con and Ms. Csi on ATV Home] Retrieved 2010-12-08</ref>

Although it is broadcast in Taiwan, the show is very successful and popular among Chinese speaking audiences across the world who watch uploaded re-runs over the internet or through bootleg DVDs.  The show has been mentioned in other Taiwanese variety and talk shows, mainly from presenters who appeared on the show. Since its debut in 2004, it has been one of the most successful talk shows in Taiwan and in Mandarin speaking countries across Asia.

 Style 
Unlike most Chinese language talk shows, the format of Kangsi is fast-paced, humorous and fully self-aware, despite topics that are occasionally controversial, and taped in a small studio. Most episodes feature a group of entertainers and politicians as guest stars engaging into discussions ranging from their career to gossip and current events. Along with its variety show approach, Kangsi frequently accompanies itself with cartoon sound effects, comical use of editing (instant replays and freeze frames) and wacky animated texts and visuals.

 Name 
This program was originally called "Qi Guai Shi Dian Zhong" (奇怪十點鐘, "Weird 10 o'clock"). And later changed to "Kāngxī Lái Le". The word "Kangxi" was derived from the names of both hosts; "康" (Kang) was taken from the Chinese name of Kevin Tsai and the word "熙" (Xi) was taken from the Chinese name of Dee Hsu. It is also a play on the name of the Kangxi Emperor of the Qing dynasty.

 Special Units 
This program is mainly focus on interviews of guests, however, there are also some special units which have been held irregularly:
 "Remove Makeup" - Female artists are required to remove makeup and wear pajamas to show their natural side
 "Gift Swap" - artists and sometimes the hosts are required to bring gifts that match certain themes, such as gifts for Christmas party or gifts from ex-love partners, and exchange them with each other
 "Apology Unit" - guests can confess to the wrong things they did recently, and sometimes their confession target would be invited to program to confront them
 Singing and dancing competitions judged by professionals and the hosts

 List of guests 
Since its premiere in 2004, the hosts have interviewed entertainers and politicians from Taiwan, Hong Kong, Macau, Mainland China, and elsewhere. Most of the guests have previously hosted and appeared in other Taiwanese variety shows with Tsai and Hsu prior to Kangsi.

Barbie Hsu, sister of Dee Hsu, made a rare appearance on the show, discussing part of her very private life outside her career.

Taiwan
Entertainers (not complete)Mayday
S.H.E
David Tao
Leehom Wang
Jay Chou
Cyndi Wang
Jolin Tsai
Jacky Wu
Rainie Yang
Ruby Lin
Barbie Shu
Elva Hsiao
Jerry Yan
Vic Chou
Show Lo
Alien Huang

Vanness Wu
Ken Chu
5566
Evonne Hsu
Fahrenheit
Hey Girl
Phil Chang
A-mei Chang
Harlem Yu
Annie Shizuka Inoh
Lollipop
Blackie Chen
Christine Fan
183 Club
Mavis Fan
Weber Yang

7 Flowers
Richie Ren
Joyce Zhao,
Joe Chen
Beatrice Hsu
Ariel Lin
Genie Chuo
2moro
Demos Chiang
Pace Wu
Mike He
Joe Cheng
Vivian Hsu
Mickey Huang
Lene Lai
Mark Chao

Sodagreen
Ethan Juan
Sweety
Jocelyn Wang
David Wu
Deserts Chang
Angela Chang
Roger Yang
Ricky Xiao
Matilda Tao
Patty Hou
Jimmy Lin
Stanley Huang
Lin Chi-ling, Sonia Sui, Bianca Bai and other Models from Catwalk Modeling Agency
Contestants from One Million Star Season 1, 2, 3, 4 & 5

Politicians
Ma Ying-jeou - Former President of Republic of China (Taiwan) 
Wu Po-hsiung - Former Chairman of Kuomintang
Jason Hu - Former Mayor of Taichung City 
Annette Lu - Former Vice President of the Republic of China (Taiwan)
Lien Chan - Former Vice President of the Republic of China (Taiwan)
Su Tseng-chang - Former Premier of the Republic of China (Taiwan)
John Chiang - Former Foreign Minister of Republic of China (Taiwan)
Chiu Yi - Former Member of the Legislative Yuan from Kaohsiung County
Li Ao - Former Member of the Legislative Yuan from Taipei County

Hong Kong and Macau(not complete) 
Andy Lau, Eason Chan, Edison Chen, Carina Lau, Ng Man Tat, Eric Tsang, Nicholas Tse, Shawn Yue, Wong Jing, Cecilia Cheung, Stephen Chow, Twins (band), Joey Yung, Lydia Shum, Vivian Chow, Fiona Sit, Ronald Cheng, Josie Ho, Anita Yuen, Wakin Chau, Joyce Cheng, Anthony Wong, John Woo, Jacky Cheung, Jaycee Chan, Timmy Hung, Kelly Chen, Grasshopper (band)

Mainland China
Huang Lei, Huang Xiaoming, Zhao Wei, Yang Zishan, Huang Bo, Liu Liyang, Huang Yali, Jing Boran, Yu Kewei, :zh:丁丁 (歌手) (Ding Ding), :zh:张赫宣 (Zhang He Xuan), :zh:金池 (Jin Chi), :zh:张玮 (歌手) (Zhang Wei), :zh:李建軍 (Li Jianjun), Jet Li, Anson Hu, Li Bingbing, Zhang Hanyu, Xiao Shenyang, Hu Xia, Ding Dang, Liu Yan, Huang Shengyi, :zh:新七小福 (The New Seven Little Fortunes), :zh:叶梓萱 (Ye Zixuan), Yang Qingqian, Jason Zhang, Lu Yao, Best Crew, Na Ying, Chen Kaige, Chen Hong, Chen Jianbin, Han Geng, :zh:嚴藝丹 (Yan Yidan), Guo Jingming, Yu Quan, Xie Na, Zheng Kai, TFBoys, :zh:汪小菲 (Wang Xiaofei), Fan Bingbing, Li Chen

Overseas
Seth Rogen, Michel Gondry (The Green Hornet''), Stefanie Sun, Kris Phillips, Take That (Band), Coco Lee, Henry Lee, JJ Lin, Maria Ozawa, Atsushi Tamura, By2, Gary Chaw, Ah Niu, A-do, Michael & Victor, Penny Tai, Eric Moo

Awards and nominations
Golden Bell Awards
 43rd (2008)
 Nominated: Best Host in a Variety Programme (Kevin Tsai, Dee Hsu)
 42nd (2007)
 Nominated: Best Variety Programme
 Nominated: Best Host in a Variety Programme (Kevin Tsai, Dee Hsu)
 41st (2006)
 Nominated: Best Host in a Variety Programme (Kevin Tsai, Dee Hsu)
 40th (2005)
 Won: Best Host in a Variety Programme (Kevin Tsai, Dee Hsu)
 Nominated: Best Variety Programme

References

External links
  Kangxi Lai Le@CTi Variety
  Kangxi Lai Le@ATV Home

Taiwanese television series
Television talk shows